Selepa is a genus of butterflies belonging to the family Nolidae.

The species of this genus are found in Eastern Africa, Southeastern Asia and Australia.

Species:

Selepa acervata 
Selepa albisigna 
Selepa celtis 
Selepa cumasia 
Selepa curculella 
Selepa discigera 
Selepa docilis 
Selepa euryochra 
Selepa ferrofusa 
Selepa geraea 
Selepa ianthina 
Selepa leucogonia 
Selepa leucograpta 
Selepa molybdea 
Selepa nephelozona 
Selepa nigralba 
Selepa oranga 
Selepa picilinea 
Selepa plumbeata 
Selepa rabdota 
Selepa renirotunda 
Selepa rhythmopis 
Selepa rufescens 
Selepa smilacis 
Selepa spurcata 
Selepa stigmatophora 
Selepa transvalica 
Selepa violascens 
Selepa violescens

References

Nolidae
Noctuoidea genera